Turbo Dogs is an animated television comedy series based on the book by Bob Kolar. Co-produced by Canadian entertainment company CCI Entertainment, New Zealand production company Huhu Studios and American studio Scholastic Entertainment, in association with The Canadian Broadcasting Corporation and Qubo, with pre-production by Smiley Guy Studios, the series premiered in the United States on Qubo on October 4, 2008 and ended on May 7, 2011.

Premise
Canine friends Dash, Mags, Strut, Stinkbert, Clutch, and GT learn lessons in friendship, fair play, and teamwork as they pull together to protect their reputations as the fastest dogs in Racerville in the animated series adapted from Bob Kolar's book Racer Dogs.

Characters

 Dash - A selfless, thoughtful beagle with a heart of a gold and a healthy spirit of competition, Dash is the leader of the Turbo Dogs who always plays fair. His colors are red and white and his player number is 1 which is colored blue. His gloves have the same color as his number. He does try hard, but he can be hard on himself sometimes. He is also very tidy and neat. In one episode it was shown that Dash also has a large collection of racing memorabilia and model cars. Dash may have a crush on Mags. He was voiced by Lyon Smith.
 Mags - Clear-headed and cool under pressure, Mags is an American Cocker Spaniel, and the only female Turbo Dog. Never bossy or overbearing, she is one tough girl who isn't afraid to speak her mind. She is responsible and cheerful, and often tends to be the voice of reason when things go awry. She also owns a pet hamster named Lulu. Her colors are purple and orange, her player number is 2.  When her helmet is off, she's revealed to have bangs and purple hairbands. She was voiced by Stacey DePass.
 GT - GT is a bulldog that is a natural born inventor and mechanic. His colors are blue and white and his player number is 3. It is said that GT can fix just about any car, and "could probably make an engine out of a leash and some empty dog food cans". He was voiced by Dan Petronijevic.
 Strut - A dachshund who is his own worst enemy, Strut makes up for his small size by making big plans, that sometimes backfire. He wants to win so badly that he'll break the rules and take shortcuts to make it happen. His colors are blue and yellow and his player number is 5. His car has six tires unlike all the other cars. He is the only one of the Turbo Dogs who regularly uses his car's special apparatus to give him an unfair advantage during the races, however it usually ends up with him spinning out or crashing. If there's a way to get what he wants without working for it, you can be sure he'll try it. He was voiced by Joris Jarsky.
 Stinkbert - Stinkbert is a terrier with a strong odor who likes garbage. His colors are chartreuse and goldenrod and his player number is 6. He is a Lakeland Terrier. He is shown to have a cheerful and relaxed personality. One of his talents is cooking. He was voiced by Hadley Kay.
 Clutch - Clutch is a Turbo Dog who is just a bit of a klutz. He is a Bernese Mountain Dog. While all the dogs like him, he's closest to Strut and Stinkbert than he is to Dash, Mags, or GT. As a result, he often gets mixed up in Strut's dastardly plans. His colors are green and yellow and his player number is 7. He was voiced by Peter Cugno.
 Cam - A Beagle who is the announcer for every race. He is usually seen on the large display screen on the side of his personal airship that he flies above the racetrack during races. He was voiced by Terry McGurrin.
 Ump - A German Shepherd, Ump is Racerville Raceway's track official. He is also the flagman for every race, and enforces the track rules. He was voiced by Ron Pardo.
 Five* - A pizza delivery dog who is in charge in the Dog-Gone Pizzeria, Five is usually seen travelling on his pizza-delivery scooter. He got his name from his "five minutes or less" delivery policy. He was voiced by Joseph Motiki.
 The Chicken - A chicken who attempts to cross the road/track in every episode, and is usually costumed according to the theme of that particular segment. However, no matter how carefully he looks both ways, he is always narrowly missed by whoever is driving by (such as the Turbo Dogs) and sent spinning to the other side of the road, dizzy, but unharmed.
 Marlene - A spaniel who runs "Marlene's", the shop where the Turbo Dogs get their racing helmets and suits. She was voiced by Shakura S'Aida.
 Officer Sarge Gruffer - A retriever who is a member of the local highway patrol. When the Turbo Dogs got lost in the fog during a race through the countryside, his laugh was able to guide them home. He was voiced by Ron Rubin.
 Zanner Howler - A young dog who is one half of "the Howler Brothers", and is Dash's biggest fan. He wears a large, gold dog tag around his neck, blue pants, belt, and brown sandals. He likes playing golf, watching TV with his friend Dash, eating snacks, and hanging out with his best friend Fanner. Zanner is from Kyrgyzstan, Kazakhstan, Australia, and Ukraine. He was voiced by Peter Cugno.
 Fanner Howler - A small terrier who, along with Zanner, is the other half of "the Howler Brothers". He wears racing gloves and sometimes a cape to emulate his idols, the Turbo Dogs. He was voiced by Terry McGurrin.
 Rock Rally - A German Shepherd and Dash's idol, Rock is actually a movie-star who makes racing movies. Upon visiting the Turbo Dogs home track to make a new film, Dash is pressed into service to double for him in the driving scenes. Dash soon discovers that the reason for this is driving makes Rock "very nervous", and he doesn't do his own driving in his films. He was voiced by Dwayne Hill.
 Auntie Ratchet - Dash's aunt. A bright, extremely cheerful little dog who lives in the country, Auntie Ratchet is an inventor and former racer with a surprising number of skills, which she demonstrates. She was voiced by Catherine Disher.
 Wrenchini*  – Wrenchini is the local master mechanic and garage owner, who is idolized by GT, who obtains parts and occasionally works on or modifies the Turbo Dogs racing cars. He was voiced by Bill Colgate using a German accent.
 Pit-Crew Dogs - A crew of small Schnauzer-type dogs who do the tire changing, fueling, and other pit work on the Turbo Dogs racing cars.
 The Alstatian Aces - A sister trio of Cairn Terriers with human hair and eyeglasses. Their names starts with "A".

Reception
Turbo Dogs has won the 2009 US iParenting Media Award for Best Product in the television category.

The Globe and Mail, Canada's national newspaper, says this about Turbo Dogs:

"This new cartoon takes the creativity ingenuity of the movie CARS and uses dogs instead. For many kids, the combination couldn't be better. Turbo Dogs is a glossy, computer animated toon based on the book Racer Dogs, by Bob Kolar. The series is full of verve, humor and parent-friendly messages about helping your friends and being a good sport. Turbo Dogs ends with its fourth season sometime in 2014."

The Hollywood Reporter writes:

"Bottom Line: Going to the dogs is a good thing in this charming new animated series. The best thing about Turbo Dogs is its flawless animation, and the dogs all are charming in a loopy kind of way. It's all stuff kids will love, and the education they might get - how to behave in the world and find what's important - is an extra added canine attraction."

Episodes

References

External links

 Huhu Studios website

American computer-animated television series
2000s American animated television series
2000s American children's comedy television series
2008 American television series debuts
2010s American animated television series
2010s American children's comedy television series
2011 American television series endings
Canadian computer-animated television series
2000s Canadian animated television series
2000s Canadian children's television series
2010s Canadian animated television series
2010s Canadian children's television series
2008 Canadian television series debuts
2011 Canadian television series endings
New Zealand children's animated comedy television series
2008 New Zealand television series debuts
2011 New Zealand television series endings
CBC Kids original programming
American television shows based on children's books
American children's animated comedy television series
American children's animated education television series
American children's animated sports television series
Animated television series about dogs
Animated television series about auto racing
Canadian television shows based on children's books
Canadian children's animated comedy television series
Canadian children's animated education television series
Canadian children's animated sports television series
English-language television shows